Cabinet of Desimir Jevtić was the governing body of Serbia from 1986 to 1989, whose official title was Executive Council of the Assembly of the Socialist Republic of Serbia. It was formed on May 6, 1986 and dissolved on December 5, 1989, due to disagreements between the Prime Minister Desimir Jevtić and the Serbian President Slobodan Milošević.

Cabinet members

See also
Socialist Republic of Serbia
Cabinet of Serbia
League of Communists of Serbia

References

Cabinets of Serbia
Cabinets established in 1986
Cabinets disestablished in 1989